Silas (fl. 1st century AD) was a leading member of the Early Christian community.

Silas or SILAS may also refer to:

 Silas (name), a given and last name
 Silas, Alabama, a town in the United States
 Society for Irish Latin American Studies (SILAS)
 Silas (TV series)

 Silas (Portuguese footballer) (born 1976)
 Silas (footballer, born 1985), Brazilian footballer
 Silas (footballer, born 1996), Brazilian footballer
 Silas, a pen name of American cartoonist Winsor McCay

See also
 Sila (disambiguation)